Bang Wa station is a rapid transit station on the BTS Silom Line and MRT Blue Line in Pak Khlong Phasi Charoen Subdistrict, Phasi Charoen District, Bangkok, Thailand. The station is on the Phet Kasem Interchange where Ratchaphruek cuts with Phet Kasem Roads. The station serves as an interchange station for BTS Silom Line and MRT Blue Line, providing direct interchange, but with separate fare and ticket systems for the two lines.

History 
Bang Wa station opened on 5 December 2013, the same day as the opening of Wutthakat station. Initially, only served by Silom Line. The station is a terminal station for Silom Line.

The MRT section of the station opened on 24 August 2019 as part of the Blue Line extension.

Gallery

BTS Station

MRT Station

References

See also

Bangkok Skytrain
MRT (Bangkok)

BTS Skytrain stations
Railway stations opened in 2013